UvrABC endonuclease is a multienzyme complex in bacteria involved in DNA repair by nucleotide excision repair, and it is, therefore, sometimes called an excinuclease. This UvrABC repair process, sometimes called the short-patch process, involves the removal of twelve nucleotides where a genetic mutation has occurred followed by a DNA polymerase, replacing these aberrant nucleotides with the correct nucleotides and completing the DNA repair. The subunits for this enzyme are encoded in the uvrA, uvrB, and uvrC genes. This enzyme complex is able to repair many different types of damage, including cyclobutyl dimer formation.

Mechanism
 Two UvrA proteins form a dimer and they both have ATPase/GTPase activity.
 The UvrA dimer binds with a UvrB dimer and forms a complex that is able to detect DNA damage. The UvrA dimer functions as the unit responsible for the detection of DNA damage, probably through a mechanism of detecting distortions in the DNA double helix.
 Upon binding of the UvrA2B2 complex to a putative damaged site, the DNA wraps around UvrB
 The UvrA dimer leaves and a UvrC protein comes in and binds to the UvrB and, hence, forms a new UvrBC complex.
 UvrC is responsible for cleaving the nucleotides either side of the DNA damage. It cleaves a phosphodiester bond four nucleotides downstream of the DNA damage, and cleaves a phosphodiester bond eight nucleotides upstream of the DNA damage and creates a twelve nucleotide excised segment.
 DNA helicase II (sometimes called UvrD) then comes in and removes the excised segment by removing the base pairing. The UvrB still remains in place even though UvrC has disassociated at this stage, as UvrB may be involved to prevent the reannealing of the excised DNA.
DNA polymerase I comes in and fills in the correct nucleotides sequence, kicking off UvrB in the process, and the last phosphodiester bond is completed by DNA ligase.

See also
DNA repair
endonuclease
Nucleotide excision repair
DNA

References

External links
 

EC 3.1.21